The following is a list of the 48 municipalities (comuni) of the Province of Modena, Emilia-Romagna, Italy.

List

See also
List of municipalities of Italy

References

Modena